Ery Bos (October 3, 1908 - March 10, 2005) was a German dancer and film actress. She established herself as a star in the cinema of the Weimar Republic, but was forced to flee following the takeover of the Nazi Party due to her Jewish background.

Selected filmography
 Impossible Love (1932)
 A Shot at Dawn (1932)
 The Tsarevich (1933)
 The Master Detective (1933)
 You Are Adorable, Rosmarie (1934)

References

Bibliography
 Youngkin, Stephen. The Lost One: A Life of Peter Lorre. University Press of Kentucky, 2005.

External links

1908 births
2005 deaths
German female dancers
German film actresses
Jewish emigrants from Nazi Germany to the United States
Actresses from Berlin
20th-century German women